Bartonella japonica is a species of bacteria in the genus Bartonella. A strain of this species was originally isolated from the blood of a small Japanese field mouse (Apodemus argenteus).

See also
 Bartonella silvatica, a related species isolated from the large Japanese field mouse (Apodemus speciosus).

References

External links
Type strain of Bartonella japonica at BacDive -  the Bacterial Diversity Metadatabase

Gram-negative bacteria
Bartonellaceae
Bacteria described in 2010